B.P.M. (1991-1994) is a compilation album by Washington, D.C. Indie band Unrest, released on July 25, 1995, by TeenBeat Records. In comprises tracks recorded by the Bridget Cross/Phil Krauth and Mark Robinson lineup of the band taken from singles, EPs, and soundtrack appearances, as well as previously unreleased material.

Track listing

Personnel
Adapted from the B.P.M. (1991-1994) liner notes.

Unrest
 Bridget Cross – bass guitar, guitar, backing vocals
 Phil Krauth – drums, guitar, backing vocals, remixing (5, 8, 12)
 Mark Robinson – lead vocals, guitar, bass guitar, drums

Production and additional personnel
 Guy Fixsen – remixing (2, 14)
 Brian Paulson – production and recording (2, 4, 8, 13, 16, 17)
 Wharton Tiers – production and recording (1, 3, 5–7, 9, 10, 12, 15)
 Geoff Turner – production and recording (11, 14, 18), remixing (5)

Release history

References

External links 
 

1995 compilation albums
Unrest (band) albums
Albums produced by Brian Paulson
Albums produced by Wharton Tiers
TeenBeat Records albums